Bathybela papyracea is a species of sea snail, a marine gastropod mollusk in the family Raphitomidae.

Description

Distribution
This marine species occurs at seeps in the Mid America Trench at a depth of 3,660 m.

References

 Warèn, A. & Bouchet, P., 2001. Gastropoda and Monoplacophora from hydrothermal vents and seeps; new taxa and records. The Veliger 44(2): 116-231

papyracea
Gastropods described in 2001